State Route 35 (SR 35) runs the course of western Maine, from Kennebunk to Bethel. It passes through Oxford, Cumberland and York, Cumberland, and Oxford counties. It is known in its lower sections for both its unusually windy course as well as its notoriously poor paving, as a result of winter frost heaves. Its northern section leads to the famous ski resort, Sunday River.

Junction list

References

External links

Floodgap Roadgap's RoadsAroundME: Maine State Route 35

035
Transportation in York County, Maine
Transportation in Cumberland County, Maine
Transportation in Oxford County, Maine